Lladurs is a municipality in the comarca of the Solsonès in 
Catalonia, Spain.

Villages
Lladurs, 72 
La Llena, 18 
Montpol, 46 
El Pla dels Roures, 8 
Terrassola 18 
Timoneda, 22 
Els Torrents, 23

References

 Panareda Clopés, Josep Maria; Rios Calvet, Jaume; Rabella Vives, Josep Maria (1989). Guia de Catalunya, Barcelona: Caixa de Catalunya.  (Spanish).  (Catalan).

External links 
 
 Government data pages 

Municipalities in Solsonès
Populated places in Solsonès